The 2022 United States House of Representatives elections in Connecticut were held on November 8, 2022, to elect the five U.S. representatives from the state of Connecticut, one from each of the state's five congressional districts. The elections coincided with the 2022 U.S. Senate race in Connecticut and the 2022 Connecticut gubernatorial election, as well as other elections to the House of Representatives, other elections to the United States Senate and various state and local elections.

This election was the closest the Republican Party has gotten to gaining a seat since 2006, where the last Republican representative was elected, as well as the first time since 2006 in which any district was won by a margin lower than 1%, this was due to the very narrow margin in Connecticut's 5th district, with Rep. Jahana Hayes winning only by a margin of 0.79%.

District 1

The 1st district encompasses Hartford and the surrounding areas, including the North-central part of the state. The incumbent was Democrat John Larson, who was re-elected with 63.8% of the vote in 2020.

Democratic primary

Candidates

Nominee
John Larson, incumbent U.S. Representative

Disqualified
Muad Hrezi, educator and former U.S. Senate staffer

Withdrawn
Andrew Legnani, former EMT (endorsed Hrezi)

Endorsements

Republican convention

Candidates

Nominee 
Larry Lazor, physician

General election

Predictions

Results

District 2

The 2nd congressional district is located in eastern Connecticut and includes Enfield, Norwich, New London, and Groton. The incumbent was Democrat Joe Courtney, who was re-elected with 59.4% of the vote in 2020. Courtney ran for and won re-election in 2022.

Democratic convention

Candidates

Nominee 
 Joe Courtney, incumbent U.S. Representative

Failed to qualify 
Anthony DiLizia, army veteran

Endorsements

Republican convention

Candidates

Nominee 
Mike France, state representative

General election

Predictions

Polling

Results

District 3

The 3rd district is located in the south central part of the state and takes in New Haven and its surrounding suburbs. The incumbent was Democrat Rosa DeLauro, was re-elected with 58.7% of the vote in 2020. DeLauro ran for and won re-election in 2022.

Democratic convention

Candidates

Nominee
Rosa DeLauro, incumbent U.S. Representative

Endorsements

Republican convention

Candidates

Nominee
Lesley DeNardis

Independents and third-party candidates

Declared 
Amy Chai (Independent), physician
Justin Paglino (Green), doctor and nominee for this district in 2020

General election

Predictions

Results

District 4

The 4th district is located in southwestern Connecticut, stretching from Greenwich to Bridgeport. The incumbent was Democrat Jim Himes, who was re-elected with 62.2% of the vote in 2020. Himes ran for and won re-election in 2022.

Democratic convention

Candidates

Nominee
 Jim Himes, incumbent U.S. Representative

Endorsements

Republican primary

Candidates

Nominee
Jayme Stevenson, former Darien First Selectman and candidate for Lieutenant Governor of Connecticut in 2018

Eliminated in primary
Michael Goldstein, ophthalmologist

Results

General election

Predictions

Polling

Results

District 5

The 5th district is based in the northwestern region of the state, including the cities of Danbury, New Britain, Meriden, and most of Waterbury. The incumbent was Democrat Jahana Hayes, who was re-elected with 55.1% of the vote in 2020. Hayes ran for and won re-election in 2022.

Democratic convention

Candidates

Nominee
Jahana Hayes, incumbent U.S. Representative

Endorsements

Republican convention

Candidates

Nominee
George Logan, former state senator (2017–2021)

Endorsements

General election

Predictions

Polling 
Aggregate polls

Graphical summary

Generic Democrat vs. generic Republican

Results

Notes 

Partisan clients

References

External links
 
 
  (State affiliate of the U.S. League of Women Voters)
 

Official campaign websites for 1st district candidates
 John B. Larson (D) for Congress
 Larry Lazor (R) for Congress

Official campaign websites for 2nd district candidates
 Joe Courtney (D) for Congress
 Mike France (R) for Congress

Official campaign websites for 3rd district candidates
 Rosa DeLauro (D) for Congress

Official campaign websites for 4th district candidates
 Jim Himes (D) for Congress
 Jayme Stevenson (R) for Congress

Official campaign websites for 5th district candidates
 George Logan (R) for Congress
 Jahana Hayes (D) for Congress

2022
Connecticut
United States House of Representatives